The Richards–Botham Trophy is a trophy awarded to the winner of Test cricket series played between England and the West Indies. It is named after the former international players Viv Richards and Ian Botham, who played as rivals in West Indies–England fixtures, but were also team-mates at Somerset and good friends. The trophy replaces the Wisden Trophy, which was retired following the 2020 series between the two teams.

In March 2021, Cricket West Indies announced the fixtures of the first edition, to be played in March 2022.

List of series

See also
Benaud–Qadir Trophy

References

Trophies
Test cricket competitions
West Indies in international cricket
England in international cricket
Cricket awards and rankings